Edwin John Deedrick Jr. is a United States Army lieutenant general who serves as the United States military representative to the NATO Military Committee since August 24, 2021. He most recently served as the Commander of the Combined Security Transition Command – Afghanistan. Previously, he served as the Commanding General of the 1st Special Forces Command (Airborne). He received his commission in 1988 through the Reserve Officers Training Corps program at The Citadel in 1988.

References

Living people
Place of birth missing (living people)
Recipients of the Defense Superior Service Medal
Recipients of the Legion of Merit
United States Army generals
United States Army personnel of the Gulf War
United States Army personnel of the Iraq War
Year of birth missing (living people)